The Western Regional Examining Board (WREB) is one of five examination agencies for dentists and dental hygienists in the United States. The other examination agencies are, Council of Interstate Testing Agencies, Central Regional Dental Testing Service, Northeast Regional Board of Dental Examiners, Southern Regional Testing Agency. These were organized to better standardize clinical exams for licensure.

WREB members for Dental and Dental Hygiene, unless otherwise noted are Alaska, Arizona, Arkansas, California (Dental), Hawaii (Dental Hygiene) Idaho, Illinois, Iowa, Kansas, Minnesota, Mississippi (Dental Hygiene), Missouri, Montana, Nevada, New Mexico, North Dakota, Oklahoma, Oregon, Texas, Utah, Washington, West Virginia (affiliate member) and Wyoming. These states help create the exam.

Other states that are currently accepting successful completion results of the WREB exam in support of initial licensure are Alabama, California (Dental Hygiene), Colorado, Connecticut, Indiana, Kentucky, Maine, Massachusetts, Michigan, Nebraska, Ohio, Pennsylvania, Rhode Island, South Dakota, Tennessee, Virginia, and Wisconsin.

External links 
 Western Regional Examining Board

Dental examinations
Standardized tests in the United States